The Tribune-Democrat is a seven-day morning daily newspaper published in Johnstown, Pennsylvania. It is owned by Community Newspaper Holdings Inc. Starting May 5, 2020 the paper will print five days, dropping Tuesday and Sunday editions. 

The newspaper's coverage area includes all or parts of Blair, Bedford, Cambria, Indiana, Somerset and Westmoreland counties in Pennsylvania.

Founded as the weekly Cambria Tribune in 1853, the newspaper converted to afternoon daily format in 1873, taking the name Johnstown Tribune. It merged in 1952 with the morning Johnstown Democrat (founded in 1863, a daily since 1888). The combined Tribune-Democrat published two editions, morning and afternoon, until 1977, when the paper dropped its afternoon edition and also debuted a Sunday edition.

In 1987, the paper was sold to MediaNews Group. It was traded to Hollinger International in 1996. When Hollinger sold off the majority of its papers in 1999, The Tribune-Democrat went to current owner Community Newspaper Holdings.

References

External links
 The Tribune-Democrat Website
 CNHI Website

Daily newspapers published in Pennsylvania
Cambria County, Pennsylvania